Julie Roy Jeffrey is a professor emerita and former member of the history department at Goucher College in Baltimore, Maryland. Jeffrey joined the Goucher faculty in 1972.  Her scholarly interests have focused on the areas of gender history—she is considered a pioneer of the history of women in the western United States—the abolition of slavery, and the history of education.

Jeffrey has held Fulbright Chairs in American Studies in universities in Denmark and the Netherlands and received a National Endowment for the Humanities research fellowship.

Jeffrey's book, The Great Silent Army of Abolitionism, was awarded the Choice Award for Academic Book of Excellence and honorable mention for the Frederick Douglass Prize, given by the Gilder Lehrman Center of Yale University.

Jeffrey is co-author and co-editor of the widely used textbook on American History, The American People:  The History of a Nation and a Society, which she has actively revised since the 1980s.

Jeffrey received her bachelor's degree from Radcliffe College of Harvard University, and received her Ph.D. from Rice University.

Selected works
 American History Firsthand: Working with Primary Sources, Volume II (since 1865) (2nd Ed.)  (2007) with Peter J. Frederick
 The American People: Creating a Nation and a Society: to 1877 (2006) with Gary B. Nash, John R. Howe, and Allen F. Davis 
 The Great Silent Army of Abolitionism: Ordinary Women in the Antislavery Movement (1998)  
 Where Wagons Could Go: Narcissa Whitman and Eliza Spaulding (1997) with Clifford Merrill Drury 
 Converting the West:  A Biography of Narcissa Whitman (1991)
 Frontier Women: The Trans-Mississippi West, 1840-1880 (1979)
 Education for Children of the Poor: A Study of the Origins and Implementation of the Elementary and Secondary Education Act of 1965 (1978)

References

External links
 Jeffrey bio at Goucher College, 

21st-century American historians
Historians of the United States
Radcliffe College alumni
Rice University alumni
Goucher College faculty and staff
Living people
American women historians
21st-century American women writers
Year of birth missing (living people)